{{DISPLAYTITLE:C18H10O8}}
The molecular formula C18H10O8 (molar mass: 354.27 g/mol, exact mass: 354.0376 u) may refer to:

 Cyclovariegatin
 Xerocomorubin

Molecular formulas